Religion is the seventh studio album by Spear of Destiny, released by Eastworld Recordings in 1997.

Track listing
All songs written by Kirk Brandon.

 "Rainy Day" - 4:55
 "Iona" - 4:44
 "Prison Planet" - 4:38
 "Magic Eye" - 2:11
 "Mile In My Shoes" - 5:32
 "X" - 4:18
 "Female Hero (7 Letters)" - 4:49
 "Werewolve" - 5:37
 "Slayride" - 4:34
 "Total Kontrol" - 5:53

Personnel
Spear of Destiny
Kirk Brandon - vocals, guitar
Art Smith - drums
John McNutt - guitars
Mark Celvallos - bass

References 

1997 albums
Spear of Destiny (band) albums